Androlepsy, in ancient Greek law, was a custom in Athens that if a citizen was killed abroad, and the criminal was not delivered for punishment, the victim's relatives were allowed to arrest as many as three citizens of the offending city. They would be held hostage until the actual criminal was handed over, and perhaps tried for murder instead of him. The Greeks called this androlepsia, and the Romans clarigatio. The persons entrusted with the office of seizing the three hostages were usually the trierarchs, and the commanders of warships.

The word is formed of άνήρ, "man", and λαμβάνω, "I take".

Some authors also use androlepsia for reprisals.

References

William Smith, "Androlepsia" from A Dictionary of Greek and Roman Antiquities, John Murray: London, 1875.

See also
Arresto facto super bonis mercatorum alienigenorum

Ancient Greek law